Arthur Jarvis University (AJU) is a private university in Akpabuyo, Calabar, Cross River State in Nigeria.

Faculties 

 Faculty Of Natural And Applied Sciences
 Faculty Of Humanities Management And Social Sciences
 Faculty Of Basic Medical Sciences
 Faculty Of Law
 Faculty Of Education

Faculty Of Natural And Applied Sciences 
Department Of Biological Sciences

 Biology
 Microbiology
 Plant Science & Biotechnology
Department Of Chemical Sciences
 Chemistry
 Biochemistry
Department Of Earth Sciences

 Geology
 Applied Geophysics

Department Of Mathematics And Computer Sciences

 Computer Science
 Mathematics

Department Of Physics

 Physics

Faculty Of Humanities Management And Social Sciences 
Department Of Accounting And Banking & Finance

 Accounting
 Banking & Finance

Department Of Business Administration

 Business Administration
 Entrepreneurial Studies

Department Of Criminology & Security Studies

 Criminology & Security Studies

Department Of Marketing

 Marketing

Department Of Economics

 Economics

Department Of Mass Communication And Digital Media

 Mass Communication

Department Of Political Science

 Public Administration
 Political Science

Department Of Hospitality And Tourism Management

 Hospitality and Tourism Management

Department Of Sociology/Social Work

 Sociology
 Peace & Conflict Resolution

Department Of Languages & Linguistics

 English

Faculty Of Basic Medical Sciences 
Department Of Human Anatomy

 Anatomy

Department Of Human Physiology

 Human Anatomy

Department Of Public Health

 Public Health

Department Of Nursing Science

 Nursing Science

Department Of Medical Laboratory Science

 Medical Laboratory Science

Department Of Optometry

 Optometry

Faculty Of Law 
Department Of Law

 Law

Faculty Of Education 
Department Of Arts And Social Science Education

 Education/Economics
 Education/Political Science

Department Of Educational Foundations

 Early Childhood Care Education
 Educational Management
 Educational Technology
 Guidance and Counselling

Primary Education

Department Of Science Education

 Education/Biology
 Education/Chemistry
 Education/Computer Science

Department Of Vocational And Technical Education

 Business Education

See also
Academic libraries in Nigeria

References

External links

Universities and colleges in Nigeria
Education in Cross River State
Educational institutions established in 2016
2016 establishments in Nigeria
Private universities and colleges in Nigeria
Academic libraries in Nigeria